

Characteristics
All Oceanus watches have the following key characteristics:
Analog watch face – Note that earlier models have a combined analog and digital watch face. 
Multi-band – The Oceanus watches will auto-synchronize themselves if one visits Europe, North America, Japan, or China. Synchronization locations are the Japanese time signal (JJY), the American time signal (WWVB) from Colorado, and the European time signals from both England (Time from NPL (MSF)), Germany (DCF77) and China in Shangqiu City, China. 
Sapphire crystal – For superior scratch resistance.

Models

Oceanus 10 series

The Oceanus OCW-10 (movement 4363 Japan, 4364 US, 4365 Europe) smaller watch which targeted the ladies segment of the watch market.  Includes Waveceptor and Tough Solar technology.

Oceanus 500 series

The Oceanus OC-500 (movement 2714) diver watch with 3 sub dials. WR 100M.   

The Oceanus OCW-500 (movement 3731 Japan, 3732 US, 3733 Europe) series wristwatches were the first Oceanus model to include Waveceptor and Tough Solar technology.  Full metal case and sapphire crystal. Choice of case and watch band material included stainless steel and titanium. First produced in 2004 and no longer in production.  A companion watch in the Casio Waveceptor line the WVA-500 (movement 2763 Japan, 2762 US, 2760 & 2761 Europe) includes most of the features of the OCW-500 series but in plastic case with plastic watch crystal.  The WVA-500 and OCW-500 movements are similar, but can not be interchanged.

Oceanus 600 series
The Oceanus OCW-T600 series wristwatches are the basic Oceanus model on the Japanese market.

Oceanus CACHALOT
The Oceanus CACHALOT series wristwatches are designed for marine sports. They include a rotating bezel and a yacht timer chronograph.

Oceanus 700 series
The Oceanus OCW-M700 was the last model introduced to the American market. It features a complete analog face with no LCD screen as well as the standard characteristics for Oceanus watches. It is unique in the Oceanus line as it includes a sub dial to show the status of the ocean tides in the current time zone. It is the only Oceanus model to include this feature.

Oceanus 1000 Series "Manta"
Released on June 1, 2007 and complete with the sapphire crystal and the MULTI-BAND 5 technology, the Manta is the most versatile and the most expensive watch out of all the Oceanus watches with a base price of 100,000 Japanese Yen (approx. US$1000). It does not include the tide meter that appears on the 700 series. It closely resembles the 600 series watch style but it is thinner than both the 700 and 600 series watches.

Availability
Casio Oceanus watches are only available in Japan. They can be ordered online and shipped internationally.

External links
Casio Japanese Oceanus Website
Casio Japan Website (Japanese)
Casio American Website (English)

Oceanus
Oceanus